The 12643 / 44 Swarna Jayanti Superfast Express is a Express  train belonging to Indian Railways Southern Railway zone that runs between  and  in India.

Coaches
The 12643 / 44 Swarna Jayanti Superfast Express has one AC 2-tier, five AC 3-tier, 11 Sleeper Class, two general unreserved & two SLR (seating with luggage rake) coaches and two high capacity parcel van coaches. It carries a pantry car coach.

As is customary with most train services in India, coach composition may be amended at the discretion of Indian Railways depending on demand.

Service

• 12643 express departs TVC on Tuesdays and arrives NZM on Thursday.

• 12644 express departs NZM on Fridays and arrives TVC on Sunday.

• This train runs on a weekly basis.

Routing
The 12643 / 44 Swarna Jayanti Superfast Express runs from  via ,
,
,
,
,
,

Traction
WAP-7 locomotive powers the train end-to-end.

References

External links
12643 Swarna Jayanti Express at India Rail Info
12644 Swarna Jayanti Express at India Rail Info

Swarna Jayanti Express trains
Transport in Thiruvananthapuram
Rail transport in Kerala
Rail transport in Tamil Nadu
Rail transport in Andhra Pradesh
Rail transport in Telangana
Rail transport in Maharashtra
Rail transport in Madhya Pradesh
Rail transport in Uttar Pradesh
Rail transport in Delhi
Transport in Delhi